The Crimea may refer to:
Crimea, several geographic entities in Eastern Europe 
The Crimean War of 1854 to 1856
The Crimea (band), a British band